Premio Marcelo Jalen  is an Uruguayan journalist award.

It is organized by Cotidiano Mujer, Unesco, ONU Mujeres and Uruguayan Associated Press. This initiative try to award journalist works to intend avoid unique thinking, promote diversity and no discrimination.

Some people awarded are Diana Cariboni, Victoria Fernández, Guillermo Draper and Raúl Santopietro.

References

Uruguayan awards
Journalism awards